The Shyok River is a tributary of the Indus River that flows through northern Ladakh and enters Gilgit–Baltistan, spanning some .

The Shyok River originates at the Rimo Glacier. Its alignment is very unusual, originating from the Rimo glacier, it flows in a southeasterly direction and, joining the Pangong range, it takes a northwestern turn, flowing parallel to its previous path. Shyok Valley widens at the confluence with the Nubra River but suddenly turns into a narrow gorge near Yagulung, continuing through Bogdang, Turtuk and Tyakshi before crossing into Baltistan. The valley again widens near its Saltoro River junction at Ghursay. The river joins the Indus at Keris, east of the town of Skardu.

The Nubra River, originating from the Siachen glacier, also behaves like the Shyok. Before Diskit, the southeasterly flowing river Nubra takes a northwest turn on meeting the river Shyok. The similarity in the courses of these two important rivers probably indicates a series of paleolithic fault lines trending northwest-southeast in delimiting the upper courses of the rivers.

Name
The name Shyok (or Shayog) is derived from Tibetan ཤག་མ (shag) 'gravel' + གཡོག་ (gyog) 'to spread' and therefore means 'gravel spreader', referring to the large quantities of gravel that the river deposits when it floods. The name is sometimes incorrectly glossed as 'river of death'.

Valley 
The Shyok Valley is the valley of the Shyok River. It is near the Nubra Valley.
Khardung La on the Ladakh Range lies north of Leh and is the gateway to the Shyok and Nubra valleys. The Siachen Glacier lies partway up the latter valley.

Tributaries 
The Chang Chen Mo River is formed in the vicinity of Pamzal in Changchinmo plains of Ladakh and flows westward. It ends when it empties into the Shyok River.

The Galwan River is in the southern part of Aksai Chin, Galwan originates in the area of Samzungling and flowing to the west joins the Shyok River.

The Nubra River is a tributary of the Shyok River, which flows into the Indus River. It flows in the Ladakh region of India.

The Saltoro River begins in the skirts of the Saltoro Kangri peak ridge and flows to the southwest. Another branch starts from the  western Siachen glaciers and flows to the west to join it at Dumsum village. North of the Ghursay Valley, it meets Mashburm Peak's Hushe River and empties into Shyok River just southwest.

Gallery

See also
 Saser Muztagh
 Nubra River
 Galwan River

References
Sharad Singh Negi: Himalayan Rivers, Lakes, and Glaciers. Indus Publishing 1991, 
H. N. Kaul: Rediscovery of Ladakh. Indus Publishing 1998, p. 30-31 (restricted online version (Google Books))

Footnotes

External links

Shyok River at the Encyclopædia Britannica
Shyok River
Shyok
"Shyok Valley Project - An Experiment In Suof Jammu and Kashmir"

Tributaries of the Indus River
Rivers of India
International rivers of Asia
Karakoram
Rivers of Ladakh
Rivers of Gilgit-Baltistan